Vũ Ngọc Phan (8 September 1902, in Hanoi – 1987) was a Vietnamese writer and literary critic. His wife was the poet Hằng Phương and their daughter the painter Vũ Giáng Hương.

He studied French literature in Hanoi, then in France. In his literary criticism he preferred writers from the end of the 19th century to the Second World War. His criticism was published in five volumes up to 1942.

References

Vietnamese writers
1902 births
1987 deaths